The Appalachian State Mountaineers softball team represents Appalachian State University in NCAA Division I college softball.  The team participates in the Sun Belt Conference. The Mountaineers are currently led by fifth-year head coach Shelly Hoerner. The team plays its home games at Sywassink/Lloyd Family Stadium located on the university's campus.

Year-by-year results

References:

References

 
Sun Belt Conference softball